is a Japanese animation film studio and distribution company based in Chiyoda, Tokyo, Japan. The studio is known for its anime feature films, short films, and television commercials, particularly those made by director Makoto Shinkai. It was founded in March 2007 when it split from CoMix Wave Inc., which was initially formed in 1998 from Itochu Corporation, ASATSU (now ADK), and other companies.

Productions

Anime television series

Anime films

Original video animations

Original net animations

References

External links 
  
 

 
Japanese companies established in 2007
Animation studios in Tokyo
Mass media companies established in 2007
Film production companies of Japan
Japanese animation studios
Itochu